The Big Rocky Fork Covered Bridge is located  southeast of Mansfield, Indiana, on County Road 720 and about  east of State Road 59, in Parke County.

Construction
This single span Burr Arch Truss structure was finished on September 7, 1900, by J. J. Daniels, for $1,475.50, and named for the creek that it crosses. The foundations is built from hewn limestone blocks.

History
The road bypassed this structure in 1987. Though no historical marker is in place, the Big Rocky Fork Covered Bridge was added to the National Register of Historic Places in 1978. The area around this bridge was known to be a favorite hideout for the infamous John Dillinger.

See also
 Mansfield Covered Bridge
 Mansfield Roller Mill
 Pleasant Valley Cemetery
 Parke County Covered Bridges
 List of Registered Historic Places in Indiana
 Parke County Covered Bridge Festival

References

External links

Parke County Covered Bridge Festival

Bridges completed in 1900
Covered bridges on the National Register of Historic Places in Parke County, Indiana
Bridges Built by J. J. Daniels
Wooden bridges in Indiana
Burr Truss bridges in the United States
1900 establishments in Indiana